Šlaǧ Tanƶ is the thirteenth studio album by French rock band Magma, released on 10 January 2015.

Background
Like Félicité Thösz, Šlaǧ Tanƶ was performed by the band starting in 2009. It is implied it was also written in 2009. It contains a noticeable amount of lyrics in French, which is not common for the band's discography.

Track listing

Personnel
 Christian Vander – drums, vocals (8), percussion, piano
 Stella Vander – vocals
 Isabelle Feuillebois – vocals
 Hervé Aknin – vocals
 Benoit Alziary – vibraphone
 James Mac Gaw – guitar
 Jérémie Ternoy – piano, Fender Rhodes
 Philippe Bussonnet – bass guitar

References 

Magma (band) albums
2015 albums